Springfield Central Stadium (also known by naming rights sponsorship as Brighton Homes Arena and colloquially as The Reserve) is an Australian rules football venue located in the Ipswich, Queensland suburb of Springfield, approximately 30 km south-west of Brisbane. 

The facility has been the permanent training and administrative home of professional Australian Football League club the Brisbane Lions since 2022. The venue plays host to the club's AFL pre-season home matches as well as matches for the AFL Women's, Victorian Football League and the club's men's and women's Academy (junior) squad programs. 

The first game played at the venue was the AFL Women's season seven Grand Final which attracted a sell out crowd of 7,412.

History

Australian rules football in Ipswich

The City of Ipswich has a long association with Australian rules, with some of the earliest matches in the 1860s played there. Ipswich Grammar School was the first school in Queensland to adopt football in 1868. The senior Ipswich Football Club (1870-1940s) was the first senor football club based there, calling the North Ipswich Reserve home. Between 1870 and 1892 Ipswich was by far the stronghold of the code in the state. Interstate Australian rules contests between Queensland and New South Wales were also played at the North Ipswich Oval. Even after the collapse of the Queensland Football Association in 1890 support for the code was stronger in Ipswich than anywhere else in the colony. However following failed attempts to re-establish the code, it became a stronghold for rugby union followed by rugby league and soccer. Australian rules has seen a resurgence since the 1950s and 1960s, and current clubs date back to this time. In recent years, the western growth corridor had seen a boom in participation and it has produced professional players for the Brisbane Lions, including men's team players Rhan Hooper (played for the Ipswich Eagles) and Sean Yoshiura as well as AFLW team players Kate Lutkins and Dakota Davidson.

Brisbane Lions search for a permanent home

Since its creation as an amalgamated team in 1996, the Brisbane Lions have always trained at the 42,000-seat Gabba during the football season, which is the senior men's team home ground. During the off-season, the Lions usually shifted training sessions to various suburban grounds. Over the years this has included the University of Queensland campus, Leyshon Park in Yeronga, Giffin Park in Coorparoo, Moreton Bay Central Sports Complex (MBCSC) in Burpengary, South Pine Sports Complex in Brendale and elsewhere, meaning the club lacked a dedicated and permanent home year-round. When the club entered a women's team in the AFL Women's (AFLW) competition in 2017, it played home matches at MBCSC and Hickey Park in the north of Brisbane and later Maroochydore Multi Sports Complex on the Sunshine Coast. The Lions considered the facilities on the northern corridoor including the Sunshine Coast, Moreton and Brendale as permanent homes but none were deemed suitable as AFL level facilities. Consequently the club sought to establish a permanent training and administrative base for the senior men's team that could also host AFLW and reserves matches.

Selection and Construction
As early as 2012, AFL Queensland CEO Michael Conlon flagged the code's ambition to establish a permanent presence in the western corridor, claiming that Ipswich would one day host AFL premiership matches. Having evaluated various sites north of Brisbane along with greenfield sites near Brisbane Airport and sites in the southern corridor such as Springwood in 2018, the Brisbane Lions settled on vacant land in Springfield. A total of $70 million was required for construction of the facility, which was later costed at $80 million. The Lions and the AFL contributed $10m, Ipswich Council $12m, Springfield Land Corporation $18m and the Queensland Government $15m. The final $15m stream of funding was secured from the Federal Government in late January 2019, allowing earthworks and preliminary construction of the facility to commence later that year. The facility had a working title of The Reserve Community Arena at Springfield. Major construction commenced in March 2020 and the club moved into the facility upon its completion in October 2022. The Brisbane Lions signed a 99-year lease on the facility.

Competition Use
The first match played at the venue was the AFL Women's season seven Grand Final (2022) between Brisbane and Melbourne. The first men's AFL match at the venue, a pre-season practice match between the Brisbane Lions and the previous year's premiers Geelong also attracted a sell out crowd.

Facilities

Springfield Central Stadium's main oval' initial capacity was estimated at up to 10,000 however upon opening the official capacity was downgraded to 8,000. There are several rows of seating around the perimeter, administration and indoor training buildings, a grandstand with seating for 600 spectators, balconies surrounding half the ground, grass hills, four light towers and a scoreboard. A second and smaller oval is located directly across the main oval.

The broader precinct encompasses training and administration facilities catering for the men's and women's elite players, such as a high-performance gymnasium, extensive learning and teaching facilities, lap pool, aquatic recovery pools, and a cafe and other spaces for community use.

Naming rights
In May 2021, the Brisbane Lions announced that Springfield Central Stadium would be known for commercial purposes as Brighton Homes Arena, in a deal signed with home construction company Brighton Homes. The main oval's playing surface has been named the Michael Voss Oval, in recognition of the club's triple-premiership men's captain.

References

External links
Official site
 Brighton Homes Arena at Austadiums

2021 establishments in Australia
Sports venues completed in 2021
Australian rules football grounds
Sports venues in Queensland
Sport in Ipswich, Queensland
Brisbane Lions
AFL Women's grounds
Venues of the 2032 Summer Olympics and Paralympics
Proposed sports venues in Australia
Stadiums under construction